The 1896 United States presidential election in Oregon took place on November 3, 1896. All contemporary 45 states were part of the 1896 United States presidential election. State voters chose four electors to the Electoral College, which selected the president and vice president.

Oregon was won by the Republican nominees, former Ohio Governor William McKinley and his running mate Garret Hobart of New Jersey, defeating the Democratic nominees William Jennings Bryan of Nebraska and his running mate Arthur Sewall of Maine.

McKinley won the state by a narrow margin of 2.09%.

Bryan would later lose Oregon to McKinley again four years later and would lose the state for a third time against William Howard Taft in 1908

Results

Results by county

See also
 United States presidential elections in Oregon

Notes

References

Oregon
1896
1896 Oregon elections